Instrumenti are an Electronic Indie Pop music band from Latvia, Riga, originally formed by two academically educated musicians Shipsi (Jānis Šipkēvics) and Reynsi (Reinis Sējāns). In 2014, band's producer Gatis Zaķis became full member.

During the years various musicians and visual artists from Latvia, Sweden, Finland, France and Iceland at some point have called themselves Instrumenti members.

Instrumenti, a two-piece electro indie pop band, has proven to be amongst the best Baltic live acts of the decade.

The band published their first single "Life Jacket Under Your Seat" in summer 2008, which immediately caught attention of Latvian radio stations. However, the group was officially formed only in 2009. Shipsi (vocals/keyboards) has one of the most impressive falsettos today's music has to offer while Reynsi (drums/ keyboards/vocals) has a genuine talent of creating incredibly rich and warm sound backed up with beautiful harmonies. Instrumenti sound has been described as a mix of Muse, Sigur Rós and Michael Jackson.

In August 2011 Instrumenti released their debut album TRU recorded at the Greenhouse studios in Reykjavik, collaborating with producers and arrangers who've worked on most of Sigur Rós, Björk and Jónsi's records.

Being one of the most sought-after Baltic acts, Instrumenti have played the biggest venues in the Baltic states and have taken part in numerous festivals and showcases all over Europe (Germany, Austria, Sweden, Iceland, Norway, Poland, UK, France, Belgium, Czech Republic etc.) - SXSW, The Great Escape Festival, Eurosonic Noorderslag, Heineken Opener, Positivus Festival, Rock For People, Waves Vienna, Tallinn Music Week among others.

What makes Instrumenti captivating is the duo’s natural wit, charisma, creativity and skills that allow them to delicately blend different styles and genres, creating an enjoyable aural and visual adventure.

In 2013, Instrumenti participated in a number of European festivals, playing alongside Friendly Fires, Keane, The Vaccines, Hurts and Skrillex among others.

Awards

Instrumenti received two Music Awards at Annual Latvian Music Awards 2010 – Best Song for "Apēst Tevi" and Best Debut for "Pandemiya" EP.

Live shows

Instrumenti have performed in Germany, Austria, Iceland, Norway, Poland, UK, France, Belgium, Czech Republic, Sweden, Lithuania, Estonia, Russia, USA, UK.

Discography

Albums

EPs

 Containing singles "Life Jacket Under Your Seat", "Kvik Myndir", "(Back of Your) Drawer", "Peace (There Must Be)", and the official video for "Kvik Myndir".

DVDs

Airplay singles

Videos

References

External links
 Official Instrumenti Website
 Instrumenti on Facebook
 Instrumenti on Sonicbids

Musical collectives